The 73rd Carnatic Infantry was an infantry regiment originally raised in 1776 as the 13th Carnatic Battalion (using drafts of men from the 4th, 7th and the 11th Carnatic Battalion) as part of the Presidency of Madras Army which was itself part of the Honourable East India Company Army.  The presidency armies, like the presidencies themselves, belonged to the East India Company until the Government of India Act 1858 (passed in the aftermath of the Indian Rebellion of 1857) transferred all three presidencies to the direct authority of the British Crown.  In 1903 all three presidency armies were merged into the British Indian Army. The unit was transferred to the Indian Army upon Indian Independence.

History
The regiment's first action was in 1781, during the Battle of Sholinghur and the Battle of Seringapatam in the Second Anglo-Mysore War in 1781. They had to wait just over 100 years for their next action which was during the Third Anglo-Burmese War in 1885.

During World War I, they remained in India on training and internal security duties attached to the 9th (Secunderabad) Division.
 
After World War I the Indian government reformed the army moving from single battalion regiments to multi battalion regiments. In 1922, the 73rd Carnatic Infantry became the 1st Battalion, 3rd Madras Regiment. After independence they were one of the regiments allocated to the Indian Army.

Present Day
Today the battalion is the 1st Battalion, Mechanised Infantry Regiment of the Indian Army.

Changes in designation
13th Carnatic Battalion - 1776
13th Madras Battalion - 1784
2nd Battalion, 3rd Madras Native Infantry - 1796
13th Madras Native Infantry - 1824
13th Madras Infantry - 1885
73rd Carnatic Infantry - 1903
1st Battalion, 3rd Madras Regiment - 1922
1st Battalion, the Madras Regiment - 1947
1st Battalion, the Mechanised Infantry Regiment - 1979

References

Sources

Moberly, F.J. (1923). Official History of the War: Mesopotamia Campaign, Imperial War Museum. 

British Indian Army infantry regiments
Honourable East India Company regiments
Military history of the Madras Presidency
Military units and formations established in 1776
Military units and formations disestablished in 1922